Carl W. Jackson (born October 27, 1984) is a Democratic member of the Maryland House of Delegates representing District 8, which is in Baltimore County, Maryland.

Background
Jackson was born in Baltimore, Maryland on October 27, 1984. He graduated from Overlea High School in Baltimore County, Maryland and attended Strayer University in Washington, D.C., where he earned a B.S. degree in business administration in 2008 and a M.B.A degree in 2017. He worked as an administrative analyst for the University of Maryland School of Social Work and served as a member of the University of Maryland, Baltimore County Staff Senate from 2014 to 2019.

Jackson was called to politics by President Barack Obama exhortation at the end of his second term that young people interested in making a change should run for office. He entertained his political appetite by volunteering for the campaign of Jon Ossoff in the 2017 Georgia's 6th congressional district special election.

Jackson was an unsuccessful candidate for the Maryland House of Delegates in District 8, a district that was seen as one of the swingiest of the state's swing districts. He prevailed in the Democratic primary, receiving 24.8 percent of the vote, but was defeated in the general election by a margin of 570 votes. After his election loss, he said that he was "so depressed he didn't know what to do." In December 2018, Baltimore County executive-elect John Olszewski Jr. invited him to co-chair the public safety workgroup for his transition team and he also later joined the Baltimore County Pedestrian and Bicycle Committee at the suggestion of county councilwoman Cathy Bevins.

In September 2019, following the resignation of state delegate Eric M. Bromwell, who had resigned to take a job with the Baltimore County government, Jackson applied to fill his vacancy. His candidacy was endorsed by Olszewski, state senator Kathy Klausmeier, Bromwell, state delegate Harry Bhandari, and Bevins. In October 2019, Governor Larry Hogan appointed Jackson to the House of Delegates following the recommendations of the Baltimore County Democratic Central Committee.

In the legislature
Jackson was sworn in on October 21, 2019, to fill a vacancy in District 8 of the Maryland House of Delegates. He is the first African-American legislator to represent the district. He was assigned to the House Economics Matters Committee and is a member of the Legislative Black Caucus of Maryland and the Legislative Transit Caucus.

Political positions

Crime
Jackson introduced legislation in the 2021 legislative session that would make reporting false statements to police officers on the aspects of a person's identity a misdemeanor punishable under the state's hate crime statute by a $5,000 fine or three years of jail time. The bill passed the House of Delegates by a vote of 130–6.

Education
Jackson co-sponsored legislation introduced in the 2021 legislative session that bans registered sex offenders from being students inside public schools. The bill passed and was signed into law by Governor Hogan on May 18, 2021.

Jackson introduced legislation in the 2022 legislative session that would require schools to release air quality reports.

Guns
In February 2020, Jackson joined six other Democrats in voting against legislation that would mandate background checks on private sales and transfers of shotguns and rifles.

Taxes
In February 2021, Jackson joined eight other Democrats in voting against overriding a gubernatorial veto on a bill that would levy a tax on digital advertising on large tech companies.

Electoral history

References

External links
 

Living people
Democratic Party members of the Maryland House of Delegates
Strayer University alumni
1984 births
21st-century American politicians